Fredric Warden Shook (March 30, 1919 – April 16, 1992) was an American football player who played one season with the Chicago Cardinals of the National Football League. He played college football at Texas Christian University.

References

External links
Just Sports Stats

1919 births
1992 deaths
Players of American football from Fort Worth, Texas
American football centers
TCU Horned Frogs football players
Chicago Cardinals players